WBRN (1460 kHz) is an AM radio station broadcasting a news/talk format. Licensed to Big Rapids, Michigan, it first began broadcasting in 1953.

WBRN formerly rebroadcast on FM translator W299BE at 107.7 MHz in Big Rapids, which made WBRN the first AM station in Michigan to add an FM translator. The March 2008 addition of W299BE had formerly simulcast sister station WYBR; it now carries WWBR.

WBRN carries a mostly syndicated talk radio format affiliated with the Premiere Networks talk lineup on weekdays (Michigan's Big Show with Michael Patrick Shiels, The Rush Limbaugh Show, The Sean Hannity Show and Coast to Coast AM) and Fox News Radio on weekends.

References

Sources
Michiguide.com - WBRN History

External links

BRN
Radio stations established in 1953